Senator Hollister may refer to:

Gideon Hiram Hollister (1817–1881), Connecticut State Senate
John J. Hollister Jr. (1901–1961), California State Senate